Lisa Raymond and Rennae Stubbs were the defending champions, but lost in semifinals to Virginia Ruano Pascual and Paola Suárez.

Julie Halard-Decugis and Ai Sugiyama won the title by defeating Virginia Ruano Pascual and Paola Suárez 6–4, 5–7, 6–2 in the final.

Seeds

Draw

Draw

External links
 Official results archive (ITF)
 Official results archive (WTA)

Pilot Pen Tennis - Doubles
2000 Pilot Pen Tennis